Janko Popović Volarić (born 14 March 1980) is a Croatian actor.

Filmography

Television roles

Movie roles

References

External links

1980 births
Living people
21st-century Croatian male actors
Croatian male stage actors
Croatian male film actors
Croatian male television actors
Male actors from Zagreb
Croatian Theatre Award winners